Alan Brown may refer to:

Politics
 Alan Grahame Brown (1913–1972), Member of Parliament for Tottenham, 1959–1964
 Alan Brown (Australian politician) (born 1946), Liberal member of the Victorian Legislative Assembly
 Alan Brown (Scottish politician) (born 1970), Member of Parliament (MP) for Kilmarnock and Loudoun since 2015

Sports
 Alan Brown, British tennis player in the 1930s, see 1931 Wimbledon Championships – Men's Singles
 Alan Brown (footballer, born 1914) (1914–1996), English football player and manager
 Alan Brown (racing driver) (1919–2004), British Formula 1 racing driver
 Alan Brown (cricketer, born 1933) (1933–2013), English cricketer
 Alan Brown (cricketer, born 1935), English cricketer
 Alan Brown (footballer, born 1937) (1937–2016), English football forward (Brighton & Hove Albion, Exeter City)
 Alan Brown (cricketer, born 1957), English cricketer
 Alan Brown (footballer, born 1959), English football forward (Sunderland, Newcastle United, Shrewsbury Town, Doncaster Rovers)
 Alan Brown (rugby union) (born 1980), Scottish rugby union player

Other
 Alan Brown (British Army officer) (1909–1971), British Army brigadier
 Alan A. Brown (Andor Braun, 1928–2010), Hungarian-born American economist and Holocaust survivor
 A. Whitney Brown (born 1952), American writer and comedian
 Alan Brown (police officer), British police officer
 Alan Brown (filmmaker), American director and author

See also
 Alan Browne (footballer) (born 1995), Irish footballer
 Alan Browne (born 1974), Irish hurler
 Allan Brown (disambiguation)
 Allen Brown (1943–2020), American football player
 Allen W. Brown (1909–1990), Episcopal bishop in America